Chesterfield by-election may refer to:

 1984 Chesterfield by-election
 1913 Chesterfield by-election